Abadia may refer to:

People
Abadía (surname)

Places 
Abadía, a Spanish municipality
The historical name of Abbadia Alpina, a small town near Pinerolo in the Province of Turin, north-west Italy
Abadia de Goiás
Abadia Retuerta